Mauricio Toscano (born 10 April 1965) is a Mexican windsurfer. He competed in the Windglider event at the 1984 Summer Olympics.

References

1965 births
Living people
Mexican male sailors (sport)
Mexican windsurfers
Olympic sailors of Mexico
Sailors at the 1984 Summer Olympics – Windglider
Place of birth missing (living people)